Michael Bänninger (born 30 November 1971) is a Swiss rower. He competed in the men's lightweight coxless four event at the 1996 Summer Olympics.

References

External links
 

1971 births
Living people
Swiss male rowers
Olympic rowers of Switzerland
Rowers at the 1996 Summer Olympics
Place of birth missing (living people)